Karl P. Lorch, Jr. (June 14, 1950 – September 23, 2013) was an American football player.  He played professionally as a defensive end with the Washington Redskins of the National Football League (NFL) for six seasons.  He also played in the World Football League (WFL) for The Hawaiians and in the United States Football League (USFL) for the Chicago Blitz, the Arizona Wranglers and the Arizona Outlaws.  Lorch wore #71 for the Washington Redskins.

References

1950 births
2013 deaths
American football defensive ends
Arizona Western Matadors football players
Arizona Wranglers players
Chicago Blitz players
The Hawaiians players
Arizona Outlaws players
USC Trojans football players
Washington Redskins players
Players of American football from Honolulu